Four Corners Historic District may refer to:

Four Corners Historic District (Greenwood, Mississippi), listed on the National Register of Historic Places in Leflore County, Mississippi
Four Corners (Newark), listed on the National Register of Historic Places in Essex County, New Jersey